Abbott Barnes Rice (1862–1926) was  a Boston merchant, a member of the Massachusetts House of Representatives, and a member of the Massachusetts Senate.

Biography
Abbott Barnes Rice was born in Hopkinton, Massachusetts on 17 April 1862 to Dexter Rice and Mary Ann (Adams) Rice.  He was educated at Brown University earning a Bachelor of Arts in 1884, and a Master of Arts in 1889.  He married Amy Thurber Bridges of Framingham, Massachusetts on 29 August 1890 and they had three children. He established  his early career as a clothing outfitter with his offices at 121 Tremont St. in Boston. In his later years beginning in 1919, he became engaged in politics first being elected and serving two terms in the Massachusetts House of Representatives. In 1923 he was elected to the Massachusetts Senate where he served two terms until his death.  Rice died on 10 October 1926 at his home in Newton, Massachusetts.

Genealogy & family relations
Rice's son Willard W. Rice (1895–1967) was a member of the silver medal winning U.S. Hockey team in the 1924 Olympic Winter Games, and his son Lawrence Bridges Rice (1898–1992) was an architect and a nationally ranked tennis champion.  Abbott Barnes Rice was a direct descendant of Edmund Rice, an early immigrant to Massachusetts Bay Colony, as follows:

 Abbott Barnes Rice, son of
 Dexter Rice (1811-1885), son of
 John Rice (1781-1854), son of
 Hezekiah Rice (1745-1827), son of
 Bezaleel Rice (1721-1806), son of
 Bezaleel Rice (1697-ca1745), son of
 David Rice (1659-1723), son of
 Henry Rice (1617-1711), son of
 Edmund Rice, (ca1594-1663)

References

See also

Members of the Massachusetts House of Representatives
Massachusetts state senators
1862 births
1926 deaths
People from Hopkinton, Massachusetts
Politicians from Newton, Massachusetts
Brown University alumni